Borna Gojo (born 27 February 1998) is a Croatian tennis player. He has a career high ATP singles ranking of World No. 113, achieved on 20 March 2023. He also has a career high ATP doubles ranking of World No. 394 achieved on 17 January 2022.

College career
Gojo played college tennis at Wake Forest University.

Professional career

2018: ATP debut
Gojo made his ATP main draw debut at the 2018 Winston-Salem Open after receiving a wildcard for the singles main draw. He faced American Ryan Harrison and lost 2–6, 4–6.

2020: Top 250 debut
He made his top 250 debut at No. 245 on 19 October 2020.

2021: Davis Cup finalist

2022: Major debut & first win, Maiden Challenger title & top 150
At the 2022 French Open he qualified for his first Grand Slam in his career.
He defeated fellow qualifier and lucky loser Alessandro Giannessi in five sets for his first Grand Slam win. 
He moved 34 positions up into the top 150 at No. 148 on 31 October 2022, following his maiden Challenger title in Ortisei.

2023: Top 125 and Masters 1000 debuts
He made his debut in the top 125 at world No. 124 on 9 January 2023 and his Masters 1000 debut in Indian Wells as a qualifier.

Singles performance timeline 

Current through the 2023 Davis Cup qualifying round

ATP Challenger and ITF Futures finals

Singles: 4 (1–3)

Doubles 4 (2–2)

National representation

Davis Cup (6–5)

   indicates the outcome of the Davis Cup match followed by the score, date, place of event, the zonal classification and its phase, and the court surface.

ATP Cup (4–1)

References

External links
 
 
 

1998 births
Living people
Croatian male tennis players
Tennis players from Split, Croatia
Wake Forest Demon Deacons men's tennis players
21st-century Croatian people